Fotonica (stylized in advertising as FOTONICA) is a cross platform, endless runner video game developed by Italian indie studio Santa Ragione and released on July 17, 2011.

Reception
The game has a Metacritic rating of 87% based on five critic reviews.

TouchArcade wrote "Really, it's hard to find anything to complain about with Fotonica. It's such a cool experience, is masterfully crafted, and really rewards playing it again and again. Definitely check this one out." Modojo said "Fotonica is definitely one game that needs to be installed on your favorite device." Pocket Gamer UK wrote "Frequently savage, but ceaselessly beautiful, FOTONICA is ultimately yet another auto-runner, but only a nutter would ignore 'Canabalt meets Rez'." Multiplayer.it said "Fotonica is a stylish, ultra-minimalist action game which feels like a blend of Mirror's Edge and Rez, therefore only hardcore gamers might enjoy its peculiar taste." 148Apps wrote "With a style like few other games out there, FOTONICA is a tricky but compelling first person Endless Runner."

References

2011 video games
Android (operating system) games
Endless runner games
IOS games
Linux games
MacOS games
Monochrome video games
Platform games
Video games developed in Italy
Windows games

Ouya games